Love Strikes may refer to:

 "Love Strikes", a song by 38 Special in the album Rock & Roll Strategy
 Love Strikes, an album by Eskobar
 Moteki, also known as Love Strikes!, a comic by Mitsurou Kubo and its TV and cinema adaptation
 "Love Strikes", a song by Katharine McPhee in the album Hysteria